Paul D. Miller is an American director whose credits include directing Saturday Night Live in the 1980s.  He has also directed for MADtv and ALF, as well as In Living Color.

He received an undergraduate degree from Ohio University in 1971, and is the son of director Walter C. Miller.

Awards
 Emmy, Best Director for a Variety/Music Program, for 1998 Tony Awards

Career
He has worked as a director in the following:
 Country Music Awards 
 Saturday Night Live

References

External links
 

Living people
American television directors
Year of birth missing (living people)
Place of birth missing (living people)
Ohio University alumni